Deh-e Bar Aftab-e Olya (also Romanized as Deh-e Bar Āftāb-e ‘Olyā; also known as Bar Āftāb and Deh-e Bar Āftāb) is a village in Sarrud-e Shomali Rural District, in the Central District of Boyer-Ahmad County, Kohgiluyeh and Boyer-Ahmad Province, Iran. At the 2006 census, its population was 1,113, in 232 families.

References 

Populated places in Boyer-Ahmad County